Fighting Thoroughbreds is a 1939 American drama film directed by Sidney Salkow and written by Wellyn Totman. The film stars Ralph Byrd, Mary Carlisle, Robert Allen, George "Gabby" Hayes, Marvin Stephens and Charles C. Wilson. The film was released on January 6, 1939, by Republic Pictures.

Plot

Cast
Ralph Byrd as Ben Marshall
Mary Carlisle as Marian
Robert Allen as Greg Bogart
George "Gabby" Hayes as 'Gramps' Montrose 
Marvin Stephens as Hefty
Charles C. Wilson as Spencer Bogart
Kenne Duncan as Brady
Victor Kilian as Wilson
Edwin Brian as Colton

References

External links
 

1939 films
1930s English-language films
American drama films
1939 drama films
Republic Pictures films
Films directed by Sidney Salkow
American black-and-white films
1930s American films